Zaccaria Giovanni Divanic (died 9 March, 1562) was a Roman Catholic prelate who served as Bishop of Pedena, Croatia from 1550 to 1562.

Biography
On 23 May 1550, Zaccaria Giovanni Divanic was appointed during the papacy of Pope Julius III as Bishop of Pedena. He served as Bishop of Pedena until his death on 9 March 1562.

References 

16th-century Roman Catholic bishops in Croatia
Bishops appointed by Pope Julius III
1562 deaths